Thomas Koelmann (born 19 July 1968) is a former German male canoeist who won medals at senior level the Wildwater Canoeing World Championships.

References

External links
 Thomas Koelmann  at Down River

1968 births
Living people
German male canoeists
Place of birth missing (living people)